Rigidity theory may refer to

Study of the concept of rigidity (mathematics)
Mathematical theory of structural rigidity
Rigidity theory (physics), or topological constraints theory, describes or predicts the mechanical properties of glass